The Way of the Strong may refer to:

 The Way of the Strong (1919 film), a 1919 silent American drama directed by Edwin Carewe 
 The Way of the Strong (1928 film), a 1928 silent American crime drama directed by Frank Capra